{{DISPLAYTITLE:CH2OS}}
The molecular formula CH2OS (molar mass: 62.09 g/mol, exact mass: 61.9826 u) may refer to:

 Thioformic acid, a thiocarboxylic acid
 Sulfine (sulfinylmethane)